Wanrong (1906–1946) was an empress of the Qing dynasty and the last Chinese empress.

Wanrong may also refer to:
Wanrong County, a subdivision of Yuncheng, Shanxi, China
Wanrong, Hualien, a township in Hualien County, Taiwan